Flora Edna White (October 23, 1892 – June 25, 1992), known professionally as Edna White and privately for much of her life as Edna White Chandler, was an American trumpet soloist, chamber musician, vaudeville performer, and composer. A child prodigy, White began her professional career as a soloist in 1901 at the age of eight and graduated from the Institute of Musical Art (which would later become the Juilliard School) in 1907. White, who switched from cornet to trumpet during her studies at the institute, was one of the first soloists to perform on trumpet rather than cornet.

White formed a number of all-female brass quartets, including the Aida Quartet, the Edna White Trumpeters (which also performed as the Edna White Quartet), the Liberty Belles, and the Tone Weavers. Billed as the "only woman solo trumpeter in the world," White toured nationally with her chamber ensembles and performed as a soloist in recitals, vaudeville acts, with concert bands, and with orchestras. In the 1920s White made solo recordings for Edison Records, and in the 1940s and 1950s she collaborated with composers Virgil Thomson and George Antheil. Her 1949 recital in Carnegie Hall was the first given there by a trumpeter.

After retiring from performance in 1957, White remained active as a composer and writer, completing an operetta, a suite for trumpet and orchestra, a trumpet method book, and a memoir, in addition to shorter songs and poems.

Biography

Early life and education 
Edna White was born in Stamford, Connecticut on October 23, 1892, to Herbert John White and Harriet Linwood Stone. She was the second of six children; the eldest child, Mary, came from Stone's previous marriage. Herbert John White was a mechanical engineer and an amateur cornetist who hoped for a son who would play the cornet.

In 1899, the White family moved to Waltham, MA and Edna White received her first cornet as a present on her seventh birthday. White's first lessons were from her father, and six months after being given her first instrument, she began performing solos at Waltham's Eden Baptist Church.

When the family moved to Brooklyn in 1901, Herbert White joined the Amacita Band, an amateur community ensemble, and brought White with him to rehearsals. She was the band's featured soloist at their annual Carnegie Hall concert on May 3, 1901, where she performed a tune from Gioachino Rossini's Stabat Mater and two encores. White received $25 for the performance.

White's successful debut at Carnegie Hall led to her engagement as a soloist for the summer concert season at the popular seaside resort town of Ocean Grove, New Jersey where she performed during the summer from 1901 to 1910. White's typical Ocean Grove repertoire consisted of hymns, airs, and variations—typical cornet repertoire, light enough to be appropriate for a summer concert – though in 1907 she did perform "The Trumpet Shall Sound" from George Frederic Handel's Messiah at Ocean Grove with singer Carl Dufft. Ocean Grove is also where White met the Park Sisters, and she received lessons from Anna Park during the summer of 1903 when they performed a duet together at Ocean Grove.

In 1904, Dr. Frank Damrosch invited White to study at the Institute of Musical Art (later the Juilliard School) of which he was the head. White accepted, and began taking lessons with Adolphe Dubois, the trumpet instructor at the Institute and the principal trumpet of the New York Symphony Orchestra (later the New York Philharmonic). At Dubois's insistence, White switched from cornet to trumpet.

White performed Raynaud's "Rapsodie Heroique" at the institute's commencement ceremony in 1907, but was not awarded a degree because of her young age (White was 14 at the time). It was not until 1984 that the Juilliard School granted White an Artist's Diploma. Dubois provided White with a written testimonial upon the completion of her studies, however:"I am happy to testify to the real talent of my pupil Edna White. Although but 14 years of age, she is already a very brilliant performer. To a very original expression, she adds a truly remarkable technique. The great success which she has already won proves this and indicates her for a brilliant artistic career."

The Aida Quartet 
In 1908, White formed the Trunette Concert Company with three other women for summer performances at Ocean Grove. Like the Park Sisters, members of the Trunette Concert Company performed on both brass and other instruments. White played trumpet, Florence McMillan played trumpet and piano, Norma Sauter played cornet and violin, and her sister Cora Sauter played cornet and cello.

By 1910 (or perhaps earlier), the ensemble had changed its name to the Aida Quartet and Ruth Wolfe had replaced Florence McMillan on trumpet and piano. The Redpath Lyceum Bureau hired the Aida Quartet for their 1910–1911 season, and assigned the baritone soloist C. Pol Plancon to tour with the otherwise all-female ensemble. The tour, for which White was paid $75 per week, took the quartet across the country to Texas, Iowa, Nevada, Nebraska, the Dakotas, and Kansas.

The Aida Quartet was hired again by the Redpath Lyceum Bureau for cross-country tours during the 1911-1912 and 1912–1913 seasons, accompanied by C. Pol Plancon. White and the Sauters remained in the ensemble for all three tours with Redpath, but the fourth member of the quartet continued to change. Irene Woodcock replaced Ruth Wolfe on trumpet and piano for the 1911-1912 tour, and on programs for the Aida Quartet's 1912-1913 tour, White is listed on trumpet and piano, and the fourth member, Clara Haven, played only trumpet.

The quartet's repertoire consisted of arrangements of classical repertoire, particularly music from operas. Arrangements for brass trio and quartet were interspersed with music for violin, cello, or trumpet with piano, mixed chamber ensemble, and one or two songs sung by Plancon. The solos White performed on each program were fantasies or theme and variations, typical of cornet repertoire, though White performed them on the trumpet.

The Aida Quartet disbanded in 1912 or 1913 after the Sauters accused White of having an affair with Plancon. White returned to her parents, who now lived in Indianapolis, and shortly after married their neighbor's son, Myron H. Chandler in Marion, Indiana,> breaking her contract with the Redpath Lyceum Bureau (for which she was blacklisted by the Bureau for several years).

World War I and the 1920s 
Though Chandler disapproved of White's trumpet playing, in 1914 the couple moved to New York so White could continue her career. White formed the Edna White Quartet (which also appeared under the names the Edna White Quartette and the Edna White Trumpeters) and, when Chandler's foreign bank accounts were frozen as a result of World War I, was the sole financial support for the family.

In 1915 the Edna White Trumpeters performed as part of a transcontinental telephone demonstration between Brooklyn and San Francisco; however the sound with all four trumpets was not clear enough and White instead played a solo, "Darling I am Growing Older." The ensemble also performed at the Panama-Pacific Exposition in San Francisco. White appeared as a soloist at the Exposition as well, stepping in to replace an ill soloist with the Mexican National Band.

White left the Edna White Trumpeters in 1916 when she became pregnant, though the ensemble continued performing under the same name for some time, replacing White with Katherine Rankin. The Edna White Trumpeters' recordings for Columbia Records, including the successful "Just a Baby's Prayer at Twilight (For Her Daddy Over There)" were made by the ensemble without White. When White separated from her husband in 1919 (though their divorce was not officially completed until 1923 and she continued to use the name Chandler in her later private life), she reclaimed the rights to the ensemble's name and renamed her newly formed ensemble, the Gloria Trumpeters (which consisted of two trumpets and two trombones, though exact personnel varied through the next decade), the Edna White Quartet.

The 1920s were productive years for White. In 1920 and 1921, White made several solo recordings for Edison Records, including Herbert L. Clarke's "The Debutante," said to demonstrate "a command of the instrument and level of musicianship that would have enhanced the brass section of any symphony orchestra." She was contracted to make 14 more recordings for Edison, but a 1921 tour with the women's brass trio, the Premiere Artists, prevented her from fulfilling the recording contract. White also began touring the Keith-Albee Vaudeville circuit with tenor Torcum Bezazian (whom she started recording with as an arranger as early as 1916) as a duo vaudeville act during the 1921–1922 season. From the mid-1920s (1922 in some sources, 1925 in others) through 1931, White was contracted as a soloist for summer season concerts with the Rochester Park Band, in Rochester, NY (where her parents moved in 1922). Her solo repertoire with the band included pieces by Jules Levy, John Hartmann, Herbert L. Clarke, Bohumir Kryl, and Jean-Baptiste Arban, all traditional cornet-style solos that White performed on the trumpet.

In 1924 the Edna White Trumpeters, which at the time consisted of White and Cora Dexter on trumpet and Ida Bisbee and Ethel Williams on trombone, went on tour for the Redpath Bureau, and may also have toured the vaudeville circuit with White's and Bezazian's act. White formed another brass quartet in 1926 with Claire Wheeler on trumpet and Velma Howell and Betty Barry on trombone which did a 10-week tour for the Redpath Lyceum Bureau under the name the Liberty Belles.

During the summer of 1927 White traveled to Paris, France, with Bezazian, who she married in 1925. While in Paris, White studied voice with a singer at the Paris Grand Opera. By 1928 White returned to the United States, and Bezazian, who had been hired to sing in a production of Camille Saint-Saëns's Samson and Delilah at the State Grand Opera, remained in France. White and Bezazian separated in 1930.

Upon her return, White proposed a new solo act with her as a singer to the Keith-Albee managers; however, they wanted her to play trumpet. Ultimately, the vaudeville company offered White a contract for a 14-week tour as the leader of a women's big band, where she would direct, sing, and play trumpet. White also went back to performing in a quartet with Wheeler, Howell, and Barry, this time under the name the Edna White Quartet. In 1928 the quartet's performance schedule included a 16-week tour for the Redpath Lyceum Bureau and two 13-week contracts with WABC radio.

The Edna White Quartet's repertoire, similar to the Aida Quartet, consisted of classical works arranged for brass quartet. A 1929 promotional brochure for the quartet lists "Classic" and "Popular" repertoire, though the popular repertoire would be considered "light classical" by today's standards. The brochure also advertises the quartet's availability to perform sacred works—Handel's Messiah and Gaul's Holy City—with church choirs.

In addition to her work as a soloist and chamber musician, White toured as a member of the Boston Women's Symphony, conducted by Ethel Leginska, in 1929.

The 1930s and 1940s 
White continued to perform with the Edna White Quartet (now consisting of White and Julie Golden on trumpet and Betty Barry and Ida Bisbee on trombone) in 1931 and perhaps into 1932, including broadcasts on New York's WOR radio station. White formed another quartet in 1931, the Cathedral Trumpeters, though it is unclear if White ever performed with the ensemble or if she was merely the owner and promoter. Promotional materials for the Cathedral Trumpeters mention White as "the organizer of this group," but not all photographs included in the brochure for the ensemble include White, and some photographs and testimonials seem to be reused from White's earlier ensembles. The Cathedral Trumpeters may or may not have been active without White after 1932.

Health and financial problems plagued White through the rest of the 1930s. After the 1931 summer concert season as soloist with the Rochester Park Band and the Syracuse Band, White was scheduled to perform as a soloist with the Manhattan Symphony conducted by Henry Kimball Hadley, however White contracted scarlet fever and was unable to play. The performance, of Guy Ropartz' Andante et Allegro, arranged for orchestra by Wallington Riegger, was rescheduled for February 7, 1932 and was ultimately a success. White received a note of congratulations from instrument maker Vincent Bach, and John Philip Sousa, who attended the performance, invited White to solo with his band. Sousa died one month later, however, and the performance never occurred. Another solo performance that spring with the Phillip James Little Symphony was to be followed by a tour with her brass quartet. White suffered a heart attack at the beginning of the quartet tour, and the rest of the performances were cancelled.

In October 1933 White and trombonist Betty Barry opened the Gotham Music School, but only half of the students who registered showed up, and the two women were forced to declare bankruptcy. White lived at a sanatarium run by a friend before moving to Brooklyn, where she briefly worked as a sales clerk for the women's dress department at a department store. Eventually, White was able to audition for and receive sponsorship from the Federal Music Project and the Works Progress Administration.

Aside from her work through the WPA, performance work was sparse for White through the end of the decade and into the 1940s. White sang in a production of Horse Eats Hat with the New York City Theater Project in 1935 (it was here that she met composer Virgil Thomson), and from 1935 to 1937 she sang in productions of Victor Herbert's Naughty Marietta and Babes in Toyland with Colin O'More's Light Opera. White formed a new brass quartet, the Tone Weavers, that she performed with in 1937-1938 and in 1941-1942 (with different personnel). She gave a few performances with women's orchestras—White toured with Signore Creatore's Little Symphony of Women in 1941 and was a soloist with the Montreal Women's Symphony Orchestra in 1944—and gave a radio performance of Nikolai Rimsky-Korsakov's "Flight of the Bumblebee" in 1938, but the dearth of solo and chamber performance work for White led to her taking work teaching. White taught cornet lessons to a wealthy woman who supported her financially in the late 1930s and took a position teaching English, music, and drama at a military academy in Freehold, New Jersey from 1938 until around 1941.

Carnegie Hall recitals 
On February 19, 1949, White (inspired by her son's suggestion) performed a recital at Carnegie Hall, in collaboration with pianist Conrad Bos and the Tietjien Chorus. The program included three premier performances: Henri Martelli's Sonatine (the American premier), Gena Branscombe's "Procession," and the world premier of Virgil Thomson's "Concert Waltz" (alternately titled "At the Beach"), which Thomson composed for the occasion at White's request. Also on the program were George Enescu's "Legend" and Tibor Serly's "Midnight Madrigal."

Of White's performance, the New York Herald Tribune wrote that "There seems nothing that she cannot attain with her instrument, and she looked an impressive figure in her blue velvet, and with a rack of "spare" trumpets beside her, gleaming as golden as her hair." The New York Times praised her "musicianly attributes, among them a good sense of pitch and a powerful, brilliant fortissimo tone" but added that "in softer passages she was not always successful at clear articulation."

The performance, though successful, was a financial challenge. In an interview in 1990, White described the precarious situation surrounding the recital:"I knew Arthur Judson, the head of booking for the hall…I went to the office and asked him to waive the hall fee and that I would make it up in ticket sales. He very kindly refused this offer. I had six dollars in my pocketbook, so I bought six dollars' worth of two-cent stamps and wrote letters to all my friends asking them to buy as many tickets to my concert as they could afford. That's how I financed it. The night of my concert I had to pay for a piano, an organ, my accompanist's fees and a hundred other little last minute items…I didn't think that I had enough money to make the final fee for the hall. They would not open the doors to the hall until I paid. So I wrote a false check…My brother met me at the bank the next morning and I made good on the check."White's Carnegie Hall recital led to a brief rush of new performance engagements. In the spring of 1949, White performed "Flight of the Bumblebee" on the CBS television program "We the People," and over the summer she gave two solo performances with Edwin Franko Goldman's band and made a 37-week concert tour of military hospitals. After a brief collaboration with composer George Antheil, White, along with pianist Harry Fuchs, gave the east coast premier of his Sonata for trumpet and piano at a Composer's Forum moderated by Aaron Copland at Columbia University on February 20, 1954. Though the audience seemed enthusiastic, White was displeased with the performance, saying"I muffed a few attacks…The audience called me back several times and, like a fool, the last time I came out, I apologized to the audience for not doing my best in Antheil's piece. Everybody was disgusted with me. They said I should never have made such a statement."As a result, planned future collaborations with Antheil fell through, but White continued to perform in other recitals. In November 1954, White appeared in a concert given by the Early Music Foundation at Carnegie Recital Hall, performing music by Johann Hermann Schein, Joseph Schmidt, and Johann Christoph Pezel, along with two "unauthentic" Egyptian marches.

As she approached her 66th birthday, White decided to retire from trumpet playing. On February 17, 1957, she returned to Carnegie Hall to give her final recital, titled "Farewell to My Trumpet." On the program was another performance of Virgil Thomson's "At the Beach," the "Inflammatus" from Rossini's Stabat Mater, "The Carnival of Venice" (with variations by Arban, Clarke, and White herself), Schubert's "Ave Maria," and unnamed works by John Hartmann and Erno Rapee. Characteristic of her earlier recitals with chamber ensembles, the program of trumpet music was interspersed with other performances: White's niece played Sergei Rachmaninoff's Prelude in C-sharp minor and mezzo-soprano Francine Falkon sang six songs composed by White. "Despite the long career," The New York Times  wrote, "Miss White retains to an impressive degree the fire and dash of the true virtuoso trumpeter."

Retirement 
Though she retired from trumpet playing, White remained active as a composer and writer. In 1958 she composed the music and libretto for an operetta, Hills of Tennessee, though it was never performed. White also completed her Suite for Solo Trumpet and Symphony Orchestra, begun in 1950, after retiring (either in 1957 or in 1979). The four-movement work, written in a Neo-romantic style, was premiered in Greenfield, MA by trumpeter Stephen Schaffner and the Pioneer Valley Symphony on February 9, 1980, and was later recorded by Gaeton Berton with the Maryland Theater Orchestra. The Suite is challenging because of the endurance it demands of the solo trumpeter, but the third movement, alternately titled "Sunset over the Mohawk Trail," can be performed separately, making its performance more accessible.

In addition to her work as a composer, White wrote a weekly newspaper column (1958-1960), produced promotional materials for Rinn Records (1960-1963), and set up her own business, Trumpet Production, to help publish her works. Her second method book, On Taming the Devil's Tongue, was published by Trumpet Production in 1983. Her first method book, The Trumpet Teacher (the date of its publication, if it was published, is unknown), is unavailable, and may or may not be the same as the Trumpet Artist's Manual manuscript in the Sibley Music Library's Edna White Collection. In 1982 she published a cassette of recordings and reminiscences, Life with My Trumpet. White also wrote several volumes of poetry, and her memoir of her time in vaudeville, The Night the Camel Sang: A True Romance of Vaudeville, was published in 1990.

Edna White died in 1992, four months short of her 100th birthday.

Significance and legacy 
White's career reflected, and often pushed, the development of the trumpet as a solo instrument through the 20th century. Though the trumpet is commonly used by brass players as a solo instrument today, White's switch from cornet to trumpet was unprecedented for a soloist at the time. In a 1990 interview, White noted: "When I started, nobody played the trumpet. Everybody played the cornet. Later on more and more people began playing trumpet, but I made the switch before most because of my study with Dubois." Like her contemporaries Rafael Mendez and Timofei Dokshitzer, White championed a "violinistic" style of playing that remains popular among trumpet soloists today.

White's 1949 Carnegie Hall recital was also unprecedented: the first given there by a trumpet player. LaPlace writes: "We are used to thinking of Armando Ghitalla as the pioneer of trumpet recitals because of the ones he gave at Carnegie Hall (1960: Hindemith, Enesco, and Hummel) and Town Hall (1958); without detracting in any way from the great man, it should be emphasized that in fact it was the "great lady" who did it first."

In 2011, Susan Fleet published Women Who Dared: Trailblazing 20th Century Musicians, a dual biography of White and Maud Powell, a pioneering woman violinist. Fleet was also responsible for depositing White's papers in the Sibley Library at the Eastman School of Music in Rochester, New York.

Further reading 

 The second half of Susan Fleet's book Women Who Dared: Maud Powell and Edna White is a biography of White, with a focus on how personal challenges (particularly gender-related ones) affected her personal life.
 Brass Chamber Music in Lyceum and Chautauqua by Raymond David Burkhart offers a detailed look at White's chamber ensembles as well as brass chamber music generally in the United States in the 19th and 20th centuries.
 Robyn Dewey Card's dissertation Women as Classically-Trained Trumpet Players in the United States includes a section on White, and also includes information about other female brass musicians and ensembles from the 1800s through the time of its publication (2009).
 The Edna White Collection is a collection of papers, photographs, musical and written manuscripts, publicity articles, and recordings of Edna White, placed in the Sibley Music Library at the Eastman School of Music by Susan Fleet in February 2003, and is an excellent resource for developing further research.

Notes

Sources

Further reading
 Discography of American Historical Recordings, s.v. "White, Edna," accessed December 13, 2020 https://adp.library.ucsb.edu/names/107484

External links
 
 

1892 births
1992 deaths
Musicians from Stamford, Connecticut
American trumpeters
American women composers
Pioneer recording artists
Columbia Records artists
Edison Records artists
20th-century American composers
20th-century trumpeters
20th-century American women musicians
20th-century women composers
Women trumpeters